Carl Gräbe (24 February 1841 – 19 January 1927) was a German industrial and academic chemist from Frankfurt am Main who held professorships in his field at Leipzig, Königsberg, and Geneva. He is known for the first synthesis of the economically important dye, alizarin, with Liebermann, and for contributing to the fundamental nomenclature of organic chemistry.

Biography
Gräbe was born in Frankfurt in 1841. He studied at a vocational high school in Frankfurt and Karlsruhe Polytechnic and in Heidelberg. Later he worked for the chemical company Meister Lucius und Brüning (today Hoechst AG). He supervised the production of Fuchsine and researched violet colorants made using iodine. The work with iodine resulted in eye problems, so he returned to academia.

Carl Gräbe received his Ph.D. from the University of Heidelberg in 1862 under the supervision of Robert Wilhelm Bunsen. In 1868 he wrote his habilitation, and became a professor in Leipzig. Gräbe was Professor of Chemistry at the University of Königsberg from 1870 until 1877, and at the University of Geneva from 1878 until 1906. This was a period rich in the development of structural theory and nomenclature, and Gräbe is known for introducing the "ortho", "meta" and "para" nomenclature for naphthalene ring substitution.

Amongst Gräbe's students was Vera Bogdanovskaia, an early victim of the inherent risks of chemical research (dying as a result of later independent research on methylidynephosphane); her doctoral dissertation under Gräbe was on dibenzyl ketone (1892).

Gräbe synthesized the dye alizarin in 1868 with Carl Theodore Liebermann. Alizarin had been isolated from madder root some forty years earlier in 1826 by the French chemist Pierre Robiquet. Its chemical synthesis was a milestone in the development of the German and international dye industry, and foreshadowed collapse of the French agricultural sector that produced madder root (after synthesis became the more economical means of producing alizarin).

Gräbe died in Frankfurt in 1927.

References

1841 births
1927 deaths
19th-century German chemists
Scientists from Frankfurt
Academic staff of the University of Königsberg
Academic staff of the University of Geneva
Karlsruhe Institute of Technology alumni
Heidelberg University alumni
Burials at Frankfurt Main Cemetery